Curt Blackburn Thompson II (born December 15, 1968) is an American politician and former State Senator in the Georgia State Senate. In February, 2023, Thompson was elected to the State Transportation Board from Georgia's Congressional District 7 for a 5-year term. He was elected to the state senate in 2004 and represented the 5th District. Despite being in the minority party, he served as Chair of the Special Judiciary Committee. Before his 14 years in the state senate, he served in the Georgia House of Representatives from 2003–2005.

Biography 

Thompson graduated from Shiloh High School in Gwinnett County, where he was a National Merit Scholar.  He received his undergraduate degree in international studies and broadcast journalism from American University in Washington, D.C., and his Juris Doctor degree from Georgia State University College of Law.

Thompson is notable for his support of reproductive health, gay rights, immigration reform, and unions. He has been a vocal opponent of the high-occupancy toll lanes project in Gwinnett County since their implementation.

On May 22, 2018, Thompson was denied re-nomination for another term after losing the primary election to Sheikh Rahman.

In early 2019, Thompson announced his plans to seek the Democratic nomination for Chair of the Gwinnett County Commission in 2020.

Awards 

Thompson has been endorsed and recognized by the Democracy for America, Georgia Conservation Voters, the Georgia Chamber of Commerce, the National Rifle Association, and the American Cancer Society.

References

External links 
 Official page at the Georgia Senate
 Historic page at the Georgia House of Representatives
 Campaign website
 
 

1968 births
Living people
American University alumni
Georgia (U.S. state) lawyers
Georgia State University College of Law alumni
Democratic Party Georgia (U.S. state) state senators
Democratic Party members of the Georgia House of Representatives
People from Decatur, Georgia
21st-century American politicians